Radu Catan (born 30 May 1989, Chișinău, Moldova), is a Moldovan professional football player who currently plays for FC Zimbru Chișinău in the Moldovan National Division.

Honours
Zimbru Chișinău
Moldovan Cup (1): 2013–14
Moldovan Super Cup (1): 2014

References

External links
 Radu Catan profile and statistics at zimbru.md
 

1989 births
Moldovan footballers
FC Zimbru Chișinău players
Living people
Footballers from Chișinău
Association football midfielders
Moldova international footballers